The 2013 Qingdao oil pipeline explosion occurred on 22 November 2013, when an oil pipeline in Chinese city of Qingdao, Shandong Province, China leaked and caught fire and exploded. The blast killed at least 62 people. At least nine people were detained by the police.

Events Leading to Accident 

The pipeline ruptured and leaked for about 15 minutes onto a street and into the sea before it was shut off.
Hours later, as workers cleaned up the spill, the oil caught fire and exploded in two locations
Oil had seeped into underground utility pipes, which could have been a factor in the blasts
Oil also caught fire as it spread over the sea

Findings 

Energy Pipeline networks and cities expanding rapidly bringing them closer – This provides opportunity for thieves and also leaving lines dangerously close to general public
No nationwide database for pipelines
In effective investigation procedures - Pipeline investigation was completed in September 2013 – but after the explosion the effectiveness of Pipeline investigation remains questionable
Sinopec completed QHSE checks across all its facilities and found 8000 safety problems ranging from Oil and Gas Well management through to standards at rented oil storage facilities
Subsequent nationwide pipeline safety check found similar corrosion problems throughout the nation's pipeline network

References

Explosions in 2013
2013 disasters in China
Explosions in China
History of Shandong
History of Qingdao
Pipeline accidents
November 2013 events in China